is a former Japanese football player.

Club statistics

References

External links

1985 births
Living people
Toyo University alumni
Association football people from Ibaraki Prefecture
Japanese footballers
J1 League players
J2 League players
Omiya Ardija players
Thespakusatsu Gunma players
Association football defenders